Defensive rating or defensive efficiency is a statistic used in basketball to measure an individual player's efficiency at preventing the other team from scoring points. It was created by author and statistician Dean Oliver.

Formula
The formula is: Defensive Player Rating = (Players Steals*Blocks) + Opponents Differential= 1/5 of possessions - Times blown by + Deflections * OAPDW( Official Adjusted Players Defensive Withstand).  This stat can be influenced by the defense of a player's teammates.

References

Basketball statistics